The Pont au Change is a bridge over the Seine River in Paris, France.  The bridge is located at the border between the first and fourth arrondissements. It connects the Île de la Cité from the Palais de Justice and the Conciergerie, to the Right Bank, at the Place du Châtelet.

History

Several bridges bearing the name Pont au Change have stood on this site. It owes its name to the goldsmiths and money changers who had installed their shops on an earlier version of the bridge in the 12th century. The current bridge was constructed from 1858 to 1860, during the reign of Napoleon III, and bears his imperial insignia.

In Literature

The Pont au Change is featured in the novel Les Misérables by Victor Hugo. Police Inspector Javert finds himself unable to reconcile his duty to surrender Jean Valjean to the authorities with the fact that Valjean saved his life. He comes to the Pont au Change and throws himself into the Seine. It also plays a role in the novel Perfume: The Story of a Murderer by Patrick Süskind; the perfumier Baldini, who takes the protagonist Grenouille as his apprentice, owns a shop on the bridge. After Grenouille leaves him, the bridge collapses and his house and shop, with him inside, falls into the river.“The Night Watchman of Pont-au-Change” is also the title of a poem written by the surrealist poet and holocaust victim Robert Desnos.

References

External links 

Change
Buildings and structures in the 1st arrondissement of Paris
Buildings and structures in the 4th arrondissement of Paris